Welcome to the Real World is the second studio album by American pop rock band Mr. Mister, released on November 27, 1985, by RCA Records. Two singles from the album, "Broken Wings" and "Kyrie", topped the US Billboard Hot 100 chart, while "Is It Love" peaked at number eight. Welcome to the Real World topped the Billboard 200 in March 1986. A remastered 25th-anniversary edition of the album was released as a digipak on April 20, 2010.

Track listing

Personnel
Credits adapted from the liner notes of Welcome to the Real World.

Mr. Mister
 Richard Page – lead vocals, bass
 Pat Mastelotto – drums
 Steve Farris – guitar
 Steve George – keyboards, vocals

Additional musicians
 Jack Manning – additional programming
 Casey Young – additional programming

Technical
 Mr. Mister – production
 Paul DeVilliers – production, engineering
 Lois Oki – engineering
 Mick Guzauski – mixing
 Mike Shipley – mixing
 Bill Freesh – additional engineering
 Tony Peluso – additional engineering
 Tchad Blake, Judy Clapp, Carolyn Collins, Eddie Delena, Dave Egerton, Stuart Furusho, Heidi Hanscher, Coke Johnson, Stan Katayama, Daren Klein, Steve MacMillan, Richard Mekernan, Sebastian Thorer – engineering assistance
 Marge Meoli – production coordination

Artwork
 Joe Stelmach – art direction
 Jonathan Owen – front cover
 Rob Page – graphics
 Four Eyes – photography
 KK – graffiti

Charts

Weekly charts

Year-end charts

Certifications

References

Bibliography

 

1985 albums
Mr. Mister albums
RCA Records albums